Lærke Buhl-Hansen (born 30 March 1992) is a Danish sailor. She placed 15th in the women's RS:X event at the 2016 Summer Olympics.

References

External links
 
 
 

1992 births
Living people
Danish windsurfers
Female windsurfers
Danish female sailors (sport)
Olympic sailors of Denmark
Sailors at the 2016 Summer Olympics – RS:X
Sailors at the 2020 Summer Olympics – RS:X